In demography, replacement migration is a theory of migration needed for a region to achieve a particular objective (demographic, economic or social). Generally, studies using this concept have as an objective to avoid the decline of total population and the decline of the working-age population. In the western world, right-wing Conspiracy theorists have falsely accused government policies encouraging replacement migration of being an example of the "great replacement".

Often, these overall declines in the population are influenced by low fertility rates. When fertility is lower than the replacement level of 2.1 children per woman and there is a longer life expectancy, this changes the age structure over time. Overall, the population will start to decline as there will not be enough children born to replace the population of people lost and the proportion of older individuals composing the population will continue to increase. One concern from this is that the age-dependency ratio will be affected, as the working-age population will have more dependents in older age to support. Therefore, replacement migration has been a proposed mechanism to try and combat declining population size, aging populations and help replenish the number of people in the working age groups.

Projections calculating migration replacement are primarily demographics and theoretical exercises and not forecasts or recommendations. However, this demographic information can help prompt governments to facilitate replacement migration by making policy changes.

The concept of replacement migration may vary according to the study and depending on the context in which it applies. It may be a number of annual immigrants, a net migration, an additional number of immigrants compared to a reference scenario, etc.

Types of replacement migration 
Replacement migration may take several forms because several scenarios of projections population can achieve the same aim. However, two forms predominate: minimal replacement migration and constant replacement migration.

Minimal replacement migration 
Replacement migration is a minimum migration without surplus to achieve a chosen objective. This form of replacement migration may results in large fluctuations between periods. Its calculation will depend on the chosen objective. For example, Marois (2008) calculates the gross number of immigrants needed to prevent total population decline in Quebec. The formula is then the following:

Where:
R(t)' = Replacement Migration avoiding the decline of population in year t
A(t) = retention rate of immigrants year t, defined by (1 - instantaneous departure rate)
∆P(t,t+1) = change in the total population in the time interval t, t+1

Constant replacement migration
The constant replacement migration does not fluctuate and remains the same throughout the projection. For example, it will be calculated with a projection providing a migration of X throughout the temporal horizon.

Results 

The raw results of replacement migration are not necessarily comparable depending on the type of replacement migration used by the author. Nevertheless, major demographics conclusions are recurrent:

 The replacement migration reached impossible levels in practice to avoid aging the population, to maintain dependency ratio or influence significantly the age structure of a region.
 For regions with a relatively high fertility rate, replacement migration avoiding a decline in the total population or the working age is not excessively high. However, for regions with very low fertility rate, migration replacement is very high and unrealistic.
 The level of fertility is a much more important than the Immigration on aging and age structure.
 The principal effect of immigration is on aggregate population without substantially modifying its structure.

Criticism 
Replacement migration as presented by the United Nations Population Division in 2000 is largely perceived as unrealistic as a singular way of fighting population ageing. One reason being that replacement migration tends to only be a temporary fix to aging populations. Instead of using replacement migration to combat declining and aging populations, government policy and social changes could be implemented. Therefore, replacement migration is said to be more useful as an analytical or hypothetical tool.

Increased migration could decrease the old age dependency ratio, which is expected to grow considerably in the next decades. However, the immigration need to effectively counter the greying of many industrialised economies is unrealistically high.

Replacement migration is also feared to negatively impact the environment. Declining and aging populations are typically seen in more developed countries, as more developed countries have better health care infrastructure and access to education that both decreases mortality rates and subsequently fertility rates in the population. Immigrants are typically moving from areas that have fewer resources or economic opportunities, as access to more resources and economic prosperity can be a pull factors for these migrants to move to a new country. A large influx of immigrants from an area that is low or lacks resources to a country that has more resources may change the availability of resources since there will be more people. Resources could be food, water, land, energy etc.

Certain countries may be opposed to international immigration. Reasons such as xenophobia can subject new immigrants to discrimination, thus, the immigrants may have trouble assimilating to their new country. The native population of said countries may also resent and oppose the loss of national identity, homogeneous national culture, and the loss of advantages for native people that replacement immigration leads to.

Advances in robotics and AI could diminish the need for migrant workers, especially in low-skilled jobs.

A 2019 paper reasserted the conclusions of the 2000 UN Population Division paper, arguing that while immigration could play a role in moderating the effects of an ageing population, the number of immigrants required to actually halt the ageing of the population (expressed in terms of maintaining the potential support ratio) was too high to be realistic. A 2016 paper on the impact of migration on the projected population trends of the Scandinavian countries reached similar conclusions.

See also
 Gentrification

Notes and references 

Demography
Human migration